The Shimmering Beast is a 1982 Canadian documentary film produced by the National Film Board of Canada and directed by Pierre Perrault. It is about a group of hunters who gather annually to hunt moose near Maniwaki, Quebec. It was screened in the Un Certain Regard section at the 1983 Cannes Film Festival.

Cast
 Louis-Philippe Lécuyer as Canotier
 Philippe Cross as Canotier
 Stéphane-Albert Boulais as Archer
 Maurice Chaillot as Archer
 Bernard L'Heureux as Orignal
 Michel Guyot as Orignal
 Maurice Aumont as Chasseur d'ours
 Claude Lauriault as Chasseur d'ours

References

External links

Watch La bête lumineuse online, National Film Board of Canada (in French; requires Adobe Flash)

1982 films
1982 documentary films
Canadian documentary films
Films directed by Pierre Perrault
National Film Board of Canada documentaries
Films about hunters
Documentary films about nature
Films produced by Jacques Bobet
French-language Canadian films
1980s Canadian films